Cataleya is a Spanish name, a variant spelling of Cattleya, a species of orchid named in honor of English botanist William Cattley.

Popularity
The name was popularized by a character in the 2011 film Colombiana. It has been among the five hundred most popular names for girls born in the United States since 2012 and among the three hundred most popular names since 2021. Variant spelling Kataleya has been among the one thousand most popular names for newborn American girls since 2018. The name is among the top two hundred names for American girls if all spellings of the name are combined.

Other variants of the name in use in the United States include Catalaya, Catalayah, Catalea, Cataleah, Cataleia,  Cataleyah, Catalia, Cataliyah, Catelaya,  Cateleya, Cathaleya, Cattalaya, Cattaleya, Cattleya, Katalaya, Katalea, Kataleah, Kataleia, Katalia, Kataleyah, Kataliya, Kataliyah, Kathaleya, Katilaya, Katliya, Kattalaya, Kattaleia,  Kattaleya, and Kattleya.

Notes

Feminine given names
Given names derived from plants or flowers